Capital Artists is a Hong Kong–based record label, owned by eSun Holdings, a subsidiary of Lai Sun Development. Founded in 1971, Capital Artists signed some of the biggest names in the Cantopop industry, including Roman Tam, Anita Mui, and Leslie Cheung, among others. During its prime in the 1970s and 1980s, Capital had dozens of artists under contract and was one of the biggest labels in Hong Kong.

In early 1996, Capital Artists was purchased by SCMP Group. In 2001, after four years of poor sales, Capital Artists ceased music production and dismissed most of its staff, staying in business solely to collect copyright revenue and issue compilations. In late 2008, it was purchased by eSun Holdings.

The Capital Artists logo is a lower-case "c" merged into a lower-case, slightly larger, "a".

History
In 1972, Capital Artists began hosting concerts and placed music producers Chan Suk-fan (Chinese: 陳淑芬) and Chan Lau-chyun (Chinese: 陳柳泉) in charge of the events. In 1975, a records division was established.

Throughout the 1970s, Capital Artists focused primarily on producing music for television dramas. In 1982, however, Capital Artists shifted their focus to the Hong Kong–based television network TVB, and began taking part in TVB's newly created New Talent Singing Awards (Chinese: 香港新秀歌唱大賽), or NTSA (renamed NTSA International Finals (全球華人新秀歌唱大賽) in 1997 and TVB8 International Chinese NTSA (TVB8全球華人新秀歌唱大賽) in 2005). The winner of the contest was guaranteed a recording contract with the record label.

Capital Artists has claimed many music superstars, and for a time, it was one of the top five record labels in Hong Kong, along with BMG, PolyGram (later sold to Universal Music Group), Warner Bros. Records, and EMI.

Chronology
1971 - Capital Artists is officially established.
1972 - Capital Artists begins operations.
1974 - Roman Tam joins, making many well-known songs over the next twelve years.
1982 - Capital Artists hosts the first New Talent Singing Awards in cooperation with TVB. Anita Mui wins the competition and signs a contract with Capital. With the talents of Roman Tam and the newly signed Leslie Cheung, Capital Artists becomes a leading record label.
1991 - At the tenth NTSA, Anita Mui is both an adjudicator and the guest performer. She steps on stage to perform her anthem, "Sunset Melody", but turns around and stops the musicians in the background abruptly during the music break. She then proceeds to give a speech, live on TV, imploring Capital Artists to take better care of the singers discovered through the singing competition, as many previous contestants signed to Capital Artists have languished without any releases to their names.
1992 - Anita Mui goes into semi-retirement. She announces that she will give up commercial concert appearances and only appear for charity performances. However, she promises to continue releasing new albums.
1994 - Anita Mui releases her first new album after resuming her career full-time.  Her album, It's Like This (是這樣的), reaches double-platinum upon initial release, with four different tracks topping the charts.  The first song, "Where'd My Love Go?" (情歸何處), breaks several records by leaping to #1 on all four of Hong Kong's Chinese pop charts immediately upon release on the airwaves, which is unprecedented.  Capital Artists holds a press conference to also announce that Mui's cumulative album sales throughout her career has surpassed 10 million, a record for a female Asian artist at the time.  The Capital Artists also produces 5,000 gold-plated commemorative copies of It's Like This to mark the album's success.  Later, one company executive will reveal that sales from this album enabled the company to award a bonus of one month's salary to each of its employees.
1995 - Anita Mui releases her last album with Capital Artists under her contract at the time.  There are rumors that Mui is not happy with the amount of promotions done for this album.
1995 - In order to boost record sales, Capital reduces all record prices to HKD 88 (US$11).
1996 - Capital Artists is officially purchased by the SCMP Group, and with the exception of the hiring of Ng Sui-wan (吳瑞雲) as general manager, nothing is changed.
1997 - After a brief hiatus, Anita Mui renews her contract with Capital Artists for an annual price of HKD 20 million (US$2.6 million).  Capital Artists pledges to redouble their promotional efforts for her upcoming album, Illusions (鏡花水月).  "Illusions" tops the sales chart.
2000 - Anita Mui releases her last album with Capital Artists, I'm So Happy (also known by its original name, Mui Mui S/S 2000), to fulfill her final contract (which was supposed to expire in 1998 were it not for Capital Artists delaying production and release of her last two albums under contract).  Capital Artists indicated that the company would spend HKD 2 million (US$260,000) to promote this last album but never delivered.  Afterwards, Mui, in a magazine interview, discloses that she decided to leave Capital Artists because she was tired of the constant personnel turnover at the company, and she felt new management did not respect her.  Mui goes on to form her own music production company, and partners with Go East Entertainment and Music Nation to release her forthcoming albums.  With Mui's departure, Capital Artists officially goes on life support as a company.
October 20, 2001 - Capital Artists dismisses fifteen of its employees, retaining only three. Capital discontinues music production, and remains in operation solely to collect copyright revenue and issue compilations. All contracts are nullified and the singers asked to find representation elsewhere.
2003 - One of Capital Artists' remaining employees discloses that continued sales of two compilation albums—Anita Mui's Love Songs (情歌), released in 1998, and an album by Eason Chan—have managed to bring in over HKD 1 million for the company, integral in keeping the company afloat.  Notably, Mui's Love Songs continues to outsell other singers' original new releases at the time, five years after its initial release.
2004 - According to the SCMP Group's 2004 annual report, Capital Artists makes a net profit of HKD 9.4 million (US$1.2 million).
2004–2005 - Capital Artists releases several albums featuring songs of Leslie Cheung and Anita Mui. Among these releases are: Hits for Kidults (成人兒歌); Tribute to Anita Mui (梅 憶錄); Timeless Soundtracks (影視紅聲); and Leslie Cheung: History, His Story (張國榮/History - His Story). The recording of Mui's final concert, Classic Moment Live, becomes the year's best-selling Cantonese album, according to IFPI. Tribute to Anita Mui also makes the Top Ten.  Revenue from both Tribute to Anita Mui and History, His Story is donated to two Hong Kong–based organizations, AIDS Concern and Children's Cancer Foundation.
2005 - According to the SCMP Group's 2005 annual report, Capital Artists makes a net profit of HKD 1.5 million (US$193,000). The Hong Kong music industry feels the effects of illegal music downloads and piracy, and many other music labels record deficits.
April 2006 - Jacqueline Chan, Publishing Manager of Capital Artists since 2003, announces an advertisement campaign promoting previously unreleased audio tracks sung by Anita Mui.  It is later revealed to be a newly restored version of Anita Mui's "final" concert in 1991–1992 when she temporarily decided to retire from concert performances.  The concert was never released in her lifetime, in accordance with her wishes, and previously, only some members of her fan club received a VHS copy of the concert as a memento.
2008 - Lai Sun Development chairman Peter Lam announces that he will purchase Capital Artists on behalf of eSun Holdings, a subsidiary of Lai Sun Development, for the price of HKD 88 million (US$11 million). Some Old Song collections album are released in the entity will be called "東亞+華星", a combination of the names for East Asia Music (東亞唱片) and Capital Artists (華星唱片). In this form, Capital Artists will once again create music.
December 2008 - Peter Lam puts on a concert in celebration of the recent merger, the East Asia Capital Artists Concert (東亞華星演唱會), at AsiaWorld–Expo, one of the major convention centers in Hong Kong. The concert, dedicated to deceased Capital Artists singers Anita Mui, Leslie Cheung, and Roman Tam, features the talents of many singers previously under contract with Capital, as well as some of the biggest names at Amusic.  In conjunction with the concert, the new company releases a three-CD, one-DVD compilation of Anita Mui's biggest hits.  The compilation box-set, titled Faithfully, sells over 40,000 copies within two weeks. (As a point of reference, Hong Kong's best-selling album for 2008 sold 58,000 copies during the entire year.) The album remains on the Top Ten list for over 11 weeks.  IFPI reported later that "Faithfully" and Leslie Cheung's compilation box set both made it to the top 10 in sales for the year.
May 2010 - Capital Artists is relabeled.

List of singers (2008-)

Male singers
William So
蘇永康
Edmond Leung
梁漢文

List of singers (1971–2001)

Male singers

Female singers

Singing groups

† Artist signed with a different label.

‡ No official English name could be found. This is a direct translation.

References

External links
 Capital Artists's former website at SCMP Group, outdated as of 2008 merger 

Record labels established in 1971
Hong Kong record labels
Lai Sun Group
IFPI members